Chester Sanders Lord (18 March 1850, Romulus, New York – 1 August 1933) was an American journalist.

He studied at Hamilton College, was for a time associate editor of the Oswego (New York) Advertiser, and in 1872 became a member of the staff of the New York Sun, and of which he was managing editor from 1880 to 1913, when he retired from business. He was regent of the University of the State of New York 1897–1904, and was reelected regent in 1909 for the term ending in 1922.

Notes

References

External links
 

1850 births
1933 deaths
American male journalists
Hamilton College (New York) alumni
People from Romulus, New York
19th-century American journalists